Hovin (also Romanized as Hovīn; also known as Evīn) is a village in Chahardangeh Rural District, Hurand District, Ahar County, East Azerbaijan Province, Iran. At the 2006 census, its population was 98, in 18 families.

References 

Populated places in Ahar County